William Cawood (29 January 1907 – 4 July 1976) was a South African cricketer. He played in four first-class matches for Eastern Province in 1931/32.

See also
 List of Eastern Province representative cricketers

References

External links
 

1907 births
1976 deaths
South African cricketers
Eastern Province cricketers